Amud, Idlib  is a Syrian village located in Darkush Nahiyah in Jisr al-Shughur District, Idlib.  According to the Syria Central Bureau of Statistics (CBS), Amud, Idlib had a population of 828 in the 2004 census.

References 

Populated places in Jisr al-Shughur District